Hong Un-jong (born 9 March 1989) is a North Korean artistic gymnast. She is the 2008 Olympic champion and 2014 World Champion on vault. She was the first North Korean female gymnast to win a medal at the Olympics.

Career 
She was an individual event finalist on the vault at the 2007 World Championships and the bronze medalist on the event at the 2006 Asian Games.

Hong represented North Korea at the 2008 Summer Olympics in Beijing, where she won the gold medal in the women's vault competition. This was the first Olympic medal for a North Korean woman in Olympic gymnastics.

Hong won the gold medal in vault at the 2013 Summer Universiade in Kazan (tied with Russian gymnast Ksenia Afanasyeva) and is the bronze medalist on vault at the 2013 World Championships.

The following year she won the vault final at the World Championships. She performed the two most difficult vaults in the final. In 2015 Hong again represented North Korea at the World Championships held in Glasgow. Though she retained her full difficulties and performed impressively, she failed to defend her title and won a silver medal instead. She was behind Russia's Maria Paseka by 0.033 point. At the 2016 Summer Olympics, she qualified second into vault finals behind Simone Biles. In the finals she performed a solid Cheng to start. For her second vault, she became the first female gymnast to ever attempt a triple twisting yurchenko vault; however she under rotated and sat down the vault, getting the vault devalued to an Amanar, and ultimately missed the podium.

Age controversy 

Hong Un-jong is the sister of Hong Su-jong, with whom she shares a 9 March birthday. Hong Su-jong had three different birth dates listed for her (1985, 1986, or 1989) at various competitions. At the 2004 Summer Olympics, she competed under the 1985 birth date, but the 1989 birth date would have meant that she was too young to compete. In November 2010 Hong Su-jong was permanently banned from all international competition as a consequence of providing inconsistent age information. North Korea was also banned from all international competition until October 2012 due to this incident, which most significantly included the 2012 Summer Olympics. Hong Un-jong has never been personally implicated in the age falsification, but the consequent country-wide ban meant that she could not defend her Olympic title on vault.

In a video, Hong Un-jong appeared to admit that Hong Su-jong is her twin. If accurate, this would mean that Hong Su-jong was in fact born in 1989, confirming the age falsification.

Competitive history

References

External links
 
 
 
 

1989 births
Living people
North Korean female artistic gymnasts
Gymnasts at the 2008 Summer Olympics
Gymnasts at the 2016 Summer Olympics
Olympic gymnasts of North Korea
Olympic gold medalists for North Korea
Olympic medalists in gymnastics
Medalists at the 2008 Summer Olympics
Asian Games medalists in gymnastics
Gymnasts at the 2006 Asian Games
Gymnasts at the 2014 Asian Games
People's Athletes
North Korean twins
Medalists at the World Artistic Gymnastics Championships
Asian Games silver medalists for North Korea
Asian Games bronze medalists for North Korea
Asian Games gold medalists for North Korea
Medalists at the 2006 Asian Games
Medalists at the 2014 Asian Games
Universiade medalists in gymnastics
World champion gymnasts
Universiade gold medalists for North Korea
Universiade bronze medalists for North Korea
Medalists at the 2009 Summer Universiade
Medalists at the 2013 Summer Universiade
21st-century North Korean women